Crawfordjohn is a small village and civil parish of 117 residents located in South Lanarkshire, Scotland. It lies to the north of the Duneaton Water, a tributary of the River Clyde. It is known for the manufacture of curling stones.

References

External links
 

Villages in South Lanarkshire